Pearl Padamsee (1931 – 24 April 2000) was an Indian theatre personality as a stage actress, director and producer of English language theatre in Mumbai active in 1950s–1990s. She acted a few Hindi and English language films, including Khatta Meetha, Junoon, Baaton Baaton Mein, Kama Sutra: A Tale of Love, and Such a Long Journey. She ran after-school theatre workshops for children.

Professional life and Personal vita
Padamsee was born the daughter of a Christian father and an Indian Jewish mother.

Her first husband's surname was Chowdhry. They had two children: a son named Ranjit Chowdhry who was an actor and a daughter named Rohini Chowdhry. The marriage ended in divorce when her children were still toddlers.

Pearl became a part of a theatre group, promoting "English theatre" in Mumbai. She reproduced successful Broadway productions using local Indian talent. She directed, acted and produced for the stage, schools and organizations. She raised the money for establishing a successful rehabilitation center for drug addicts.

Pearl then married Alyque Padamsee who was also active in English theatre.  Shortly after her second marriage, Pearl endured the death of her 10-year-old daughter, Rohini, who died after a wasting illness.

With Alyque Padamsee, Pearl had a daughter, Raell Padamsee, who runs her own theatre company in Mumbai. Pearl and Alyque were divorced very shortly after the birth of Raell.

Pearl Padamsee died on 24 April 2000. She is buried at a Christian cemetery in Bandra.

References

External links 
 
 A night remembering 'Pearl' (25 Apr 2010) The Times of India

1931 births
2000 deaths
20th-century Indian actresses
Actresses in Hindi cinema
Indian Christians
Indian film actresses
Indian people of Jewish descent
Indian stage actresses
Indian theatre directors
Indian theatre managers and producers
Actresses from Mumbai
Businesspeople from Mumbai
Indian women theatre directors
20th-century Indian businesspeople
20th-century Indian businesswomen
Jewish actresses
Businesswomen from Maharashtra